The Bible is a television miniseries based on the Bible. It was produced by Roma Downey and Mark Burnett and was broadcast weekly between March 3 and 31, 2013 on History channel. It has since been adapted for release to theaters as a feature film (138 minutes), the 2014 American epic biblical drama Son of God.

Burnett, best known for producing prime-time hit reality shows, considers the scripted 10-hour series to be the "most important" project he has undertaken. The project was conceived by Burnett and Downey after watching Cecil B. DeMille's 1956 film The Ten Commandments for the first time since childhood.

The series is Mark Burnett's first scripted project. In addition to Burnett and Downey, executive producers include Richard Bedser and History's Dirk Hoogstra and Julian P. Hobbs. The first episode of the mini-series was seen by 13.1 million viewers, the largest cable television audience of 2013 to date. The second installment continued "to deliver blockbuster ratings" for the network, attracting 10.8 million viewers. The third installment on March 17, 2013, was once again the No. 1 show on all of Sunday night television with 10.9 million total viewers. In addition, the series garnered 4.2 million adults 25–54 and 3.5 million adults 18–49. In total, with subsequent airings, The Bible has received more than 100 million cumulative views.

The series received three Emmy Award nominations for best miniseries, and sound editing and sound mixing on July 18, 2013.

Parts of the telecast – including unaired footage – have been turned into a feature film about the life of Jesus entitled Son of God. A sequel series with the title A.D. The Bible Continues aired on NBC.

Description
The series covers "Genesis to Revelation" in "one grand narrative," structured as ten hour-long episodes broadcast in five pairs, with each episode containing two or three biblical stories told through live action and computer-generated imagery. According to Burnett, it included "obvious" stories such as Noah's Ark, the Exodus, and the life of Jesus Christ. Five hours are taken from the Old Testament, five from the New. The series is based on the New International Version and the New Revised Standard Version of the Bible.

Downey and Burnett said their "greatest hope" in making the series was that it would "affect a new generation of viewers and draw them back to the Bible."

"Part of what we hoped to accomplish with the series was to show the Bible is not simply a collection of unconnected stories which are often discussed and analyzed in snippets with chapter and verse numbers," the couple wrote in an op-ed in The Huffington Post. "Instead, we wanted to show how the Old Testament connects seamlessly to the New Testament. How they are one sweeping story with one grand, overriding message: God loves each one of us as if we were the only person in all the world to love."

Development

In May 2011, The New York Times reported that Downey, Burnett and their production team were selecting stories for the series, with production scheduled to begin in 2012 for a 2013 broadcast. The budget for the series was under $22 million. Researchers and theologians were asked to verify accuracy. Academic consultants included Craig A. Evans, Helen Bond, Paula Gooder, Mark Goodacre and Candida Moss. Shooting took place in Morocco and elsewhere.

Burnett and Downey consulted "a wide range of pastors and academics," including their friend Joel Osteen, Joshua Garroway (a rabbi from Hebrew Union College), and a Catholic cardinal. Geoff Tunnicliffe of the World Evangelical Alliance, read each episode's script and visited the set in Morocco: he "wanted to be sure that the final edits would hold together as a singular thematic message throughout the entire series" and  "was not disappointed." Another consultant, Focus on the Family President Jim Daly, applauded the couple's courage for making the series: "Let's face it, it takes some moxie to lift up the Bible in the middle of Hollywood. In fact, when they first proposed the project they were told to try and tell the story without mentioning Jesus. They refused."

Other project advisors included:
 Rick Warren (pastor, Saddleback Church)
 Erwin McManus (pastor, Mosaic)
Sam Rodriguez (National Hispanic Christian Leadership Conference)
Paul Eshleman (Campus Crusade for Christ)
Bobby Gruenewald (YouVersion Bible)
Brad Lomenick (Catalyst)
 Leith Anderson (president, National Association of Evangelicals)
Frank Wright (president, National Religious Broadcasters)
Tom Peterson (Catholics Come Home)
 Gabe Lyons (founder of the Fermi Project)
 Luis Palau (Christian evangelist)
 George Wood (General Superintendent of the General Council of the Assemblies of God in the United States of America)
 Craig Groeschel (Life Church)
Denny Rydberg (Young Life)
Andrew Benton (president, Pepperdine University)

Days before the series premiere, Downey and Burnett authored an op-ed for The Wall Street Journal arguing that Bible teaching should be mandatory in U.S. public schools because "(t)he foundations of knowledge of the ancient world – which informs the understanding of the modern world – are biblical in origin."

Cast

 Diogo Morgado – Jesus of Nazareth 
 Darwin Shaw – Peter 
 Roma Downey – Mary, mother of Jesus
 Leila Mimmack – Mary (young)
 Greg Hicks – Pontius Pilate
 Sebastian Knapp – John
 Amber Rose Revah – Mary Magdalene
 Adrian Schiller – Caiaphas
 Joe Wredden – Judas Iscariot 
 Andrew Brooke – Antonius
 Louise Delamere – Claudia
 Matthew Gravelle – Thomas
 Simon Kunz – Nicodemus
 Paul Brightwell – Malchus
 Fraser Ayres – Barabbas
 Michael Legge – Stephen
 Paul Marc Davis – Simon the Pharisee
 Paul Freeman – Samuel
 Will Houston – Moses
 Joe Forte – Moses (young)
 Melia Kreiling – Bathsheba 
 Dhaffer L'Abidine – Uriah 
 Francis Magee – Saul 
 Con O'Neill – Paul the Apostle
 Joe Coen – Joseph, father of Jesus
 Stephanie Leonidas – Rahab
 Mohamen Mehdi Ouazanni – Satan
 Gary Oliver – Abraham 
 Josephine Butler – Sarah
 Andrew Scarborough – Joshua
 Sean Knopp – Joshua (young)
 Clive Wood – Nathan 
 Hara Yannas – Michal
 Langley Kirkwood – David
 Jassa Ahluwalia – David (young)
 Eddie Elks – Angel Gabriel 
 Nonso Anozie – Samson 
 Jake Canuso – Daniel 
 Sam Douglas – Herod the Great 
 Gerald Kyd – Cyrus the Great 
 Peter Guinness – Nebuchadnezzar II 
 Cristian Solimeno – Jonathan
 Laurie Calvert – Jonathan (young)
 Paul Knops – Adam 
 Darcie Lincoln – Eve
 Hugo Rossi – Isaac 
 Conan Stevens – Goliath
 Sharon Duncan-Brewster – Samson's mother
 Kierston Wareing – Delilah 
 Lonyo – Guardian angel
 David Rintoul – Noah
 Aharon Ipalé – Pharaoh
 Stewart Scudamore – Ramesses
 Sean Teale – Ramesses (young)
 Jalaal Hartley – Nashon
 Shivani Ghai – Batya
 Louis Hilyer – Aaron
 Joanna Foster – Miriam
 Soraya Radford – Hagar
 Antonio Magro – Lot
 Rachel Edwards – Lot's wife
 Raad Rawi – Jeremiah
 Samuel Collings – Zedekiah
 Christopher Simon – Azariah
 David Freedman – Eleazar the Scribe
 Jake Maskall – Bashaa
 Sana Mouziane – Martha
 Aniss Elkohen – Lazarus

Episodes

Reception

TV ratings
The opening episode of the series premiered to very high ratings. The miniseries was watched by 13.1 million total viewers, according to Nielsen. In Canada, the premiere was watched by 1.05 million viewers. The second installment saw a ratings slippage, but still brought in 10.8 million viewers, tops in all television for the 8–10 p.m. time period. Week three's installment, meanwhile, garnered 10.9 million total viewers.

Critical reception
The review aggregator website Rotten Tomatoes reported that 14% of critics have given the series a positive review based on 14 reviews, with an average rating of 4.63/10. The site's critics consensus reads, "An earnest but shallow take on the Greatest Story ever Told, The Bible suffers from leaden pacing and mediocre special effects." At Metacritic, it has a weighted average score of 45 out of 100 based on 13 critics, indicating "mixed or average reviews".

Allan Yuhas of The Guardian compared the series to reality TV, as well as criticising the lack of ethnic minorities in major roles.

Distribution
On March 19, 2013, Roma Downey and Mark Burnett offered remarks on the viewership and its anticipated diffusion. He said: "We've realized, on the journey around the country to churches and all over the place, many people cannot afford cable TV. And those people need to see this Bible series. So we're rushing the DVD out April 2nd, also immediately with Spanish subtitles. This is very important. And this is only for America and Canada. Now we're about to start around the world. This will be in every country of the world. More people will see this series than everything we ever made; together, combined. Billions of people will see this series. Billions."

Differences from the Bible
In the introduction to each episode, the message is displayed "This program is an adaptation of Bible stories that changed our world. It endeavors to stay true to the spirit of the Book." Roma Downey stated in an interview, "we had a great team of scholars and theologians helping us, making sure that we told these stories accurately and truthfully".  A few of the cases of artistic license that have raised comment include:
 In the Bible, Noah's three sons are fully grown men, whereas in the TV series they are depicted as boys.
 Abraham is depicted as begging his nephew Lot not to part ways with him, whereas in Genesis they part amicably and Abraham is encouraging of Lot's decision.
 In the Book of Genesis, the angelic visitors were approached by Lot who insisted that they stay with him. Then they feasted with Lot in his home. The series shows the angels approaching Lot, begging for help with no hospitality extended to them. (Genesis 19:1-5)
 The text describes a mob gathered outside of Lot's home wanting to rape his two angelic visitors, and Lot offering his daughters instead. The series omits this. (Genesis 19:4-10)
 The series shows Sarah running after Abraham once she realizes he is going to sacrifice Isaac. This is not in the text. (Genesis 22:1-19)
 In the Binding of Isaac, the text describes a ram (adult) caught by its horns in a thicket. The miniseries depicts a juvenile lamb caught by its leg. (Genesis 22:13)
 Moses's sister Miriam is depicted as a slave and as younger than him, while in the biblical story she is significantly older and has been watching out for him since he was a baby.
The Bible text says that Samson tied torches on 300 foxes' tails causing them to burn the Phillistines' crops and plants. This was because Samson was angry with his father-in-law for giving his wife to another man. When they heard this they burned Samson's wife and her father to death (Judges 15: 4–6). In the series the Philistine commander has Samson's wife and her father put to death as a consequence for marrying Samson, who was an Israelite.
The incident in which Saul makes an unlawful sacrifice to God before the prophet Samuel arrives takes place before the famous Battle of Michmash. In the Bible, it was when he spared King Agag of the Amalekites that Saul was denounced as king by Samuel and the Lord, several years after King Saul's unlawful sacrifice.
 When the Babylonians destroy Jerusalem, Jeremiah is depicted as escaping unnoticed by the invaders. In the text Jeremiah is captured, bound in chains and later released. (Jeremiah 39:11-40:6)
 The show depicts Daniel and his three compatriots being captured during the siege, when they were deported more than a decade before Jerusalem's destruction. (Daniel 1; 2 Kings 24:10-16)
 The miniseries depicts the prophet Isaiah as a contemporary of Daniel, living during the time of the Babylonian exile. This is a major inconsistency with the text as Isaiah prophesied that Cyrus the Persian would release the captives after a period of time. This prophecy occurred 150 years before Cyrus was born, 180 years before Cyrus performed any of these feats, and 80 years before the Jews were taken into exile. meaning that Isaiah could never have existed contemporaneously—that is, at the same time—as Daniel and Cyrus. (Isaiah 44:28; 45:1; 45:13). 
 In the miniseries' depiction of the Temptation of Christ, the Devil took Jesus to a high mountain when he tempted Jesus to throw himself down. In the text, the Devil tempted Jesus to throw himself down from the pinnacle of the temple. The high mountain was where the devil tempted Jesus to worship him. (Matthew 4:1-11; Luke 4:1-13)
 In the Bible, Jesus had the mourners remove the stone, and then he called for Lazarus to come out.  In the miniseries, Jesus enters Lazarus' tomb and kisses him on the head, while not even addressing Lazarus, and gives a brand-new monologue. (John 11:38-44)

Lookalike controversy
There have been claims of a resemblance of the actor in the role of Satan (Mohamen Mehdi Ouazanni) to former U.S. President Barack Obama. The resemblance was first pointed out notably by Glenn Beck ahead of the episode's premiere.  This led the History Channel to announce:

Burnett and Downey responded in a joint statement that "This is utter nonsense" and that the actor, Mehdi Ouazanni, had previously played Satanic characters long before Barack Obama was elected as President.  Downey added separately:

In the film Son of God, all scenes with Satan were deleted. Speaking to the Hollywood Reporter, Roma Downey said,

Awards and nominations
The Bible was nominated for three Primetime Emmy Awards; Outstanding Miniseries or Movie, Outstanding Sound Editing for a Miniseries, Movie or a Special, and Outstanding Sound Mixing for a Miniseries or a Movie. The 44th GMA Dove Awards gave a tribute to the miniseries in October 2013. In 2014, The Bible won the honor of Home Media Magazine's Best Miniseries or TV Movie on Disc for the year.

Other media

International broadcasts

  – History: March 3, 2013 – March 31, 2013
  – History: March 3, 2013 – March 31, 2013
  – Antena 3: March 25, 2013 – April 2013
  - Alfa TV: Premiered December 1, 2013
  – Caracol TV: March 28, 2013 – April 2013
  – Canal 13: March 29, 2013 – April 2013 / March 30, 2018
  – SIC: March 30, 2013 – March 31, 2013
  – ANT1: April 29, 2013 – May 4, 2013
  – ANT1: April 29, 2013 – May 4, 2013
  – Channel 5: November 30, 2013 – December 22, 2013
  – Nine Network: Premiered July 16, 2013
  – Rede Record: Premiered October 16, 2013
  – Polsat: Premiered October 19, 2013
  – TVB Pearl: Premiered November 6, 2013
  – KTN: Premiered October 7, 2013
  – Paris Première: Premiered December 8, 2013
  – TV3 (Ireland): December 21, 2013
  – Slovenská televízia: Premiered December 23, 2013
  – TV-3: Premiered January 2014
  – Rete 4: Premiered March 23, 2014
  – Canal 5: April 14, 2014 – April 19, 2014 / March 26, 2018 – March 30, 2018 / April 15, 2019 – April 19, 2019 (Holy Week special)
  – Teletica Canal 7: April 17, 2014 – April 18, 2014
  – ABS-CBN: April 17, 2014 – April 19, 2014 / April 13–15, 2017 / March 29, 2018 – March 31, 2018 / April 18, 2019 - April 19, 2019 / April 9, 2020 - April 11, 2020 Cinema One: April 19, 2019 - April 20, 2019 / April 9, 2020 - April 11, 2020    Kapamilya Channel and A2Z: April 1, 2021 - April 3, 2021 / April 14, 2022 - April 16, 2022 (Holy Week special)
  – América Televisión: April 6, 2014 – April –, 2014
  – EO: Premiered May 12, 2014
  – VOX: April 17, 2014 – April 19, 2014
  – Ecuavisa, Ecuavisa HD: April 5, 2014 – April 19, 2014
  - LBCI: April 10, 2014 – April 20, 2014.
  – Telemundo: March 25, 2015
  – Australian Christian Channel

DVD release
The series became the biggest-selling miniseries on DVD in its first week of release, and biggest on Blu-ray and Digital HD of all time. In its first week on home video, 'The Bible' series sold 525,000 copies. It was the fastest selling television show on DVD since 2008. A Blu-ray version is also available via 20th Century Fox.

Novel
Roma Downey and Mark Burnett have also released a novelization of this miniseries, entitled A Story of God and All of Us: A Novel Based on the Epic TV Miniseries "The Bible." It debuted at No. 27 on the New York Times Best-Seller List.

Soundtrack

A CD was released on March 12, 2013, with Christian music singers performing songs inspired by the miniseries:

Score

Theatrical release

Mark Burnett announced in April 2013 that a three-hour version was being prepared for global theatrical release. He claimed that he has had no distribution arrangements yet, though he could possibly release it himself. In June 2013, Burnett elaborated that the film, which has already been edited, would focus exclusively on the life of Jesus, and would run at two hours and fifteen minutes. In September 2013, it was announced that 20th Century Fox would partner with Burnett on theatrical distribution, currently titled Son of God. In October 2013, it was announced that Son of God would be released on February 28, 2014.

Sequel – A.D.

On December 17, 2013, it was announced that there would be a follow-up miniseries in 2015, titled A.D. The Bible Continues, also produced by Burnett, Downey, and Bedser. The limited series began airing on NBC on Easter Sunday, April 5. It airs in twelve weekly one-hour episodes. The story takes place immediately after the events of The Bible, beginning with the Crucifixion and Resurrection, and continues with the first ten chapters of the Book of Acts. On July 3, 2015, NBC cancelled A.D. The Bible Continues after one season. However, producers Burnett and Downey plan future biblical productions on their OTT digital channel.

See also
 Depiction of Jesus
 The Bible in film

References

External links
 
 The Bible Series - full episodes on YouTube
 The Bible - History Channel (official History Channel website)

2010s American drama television miniseries
2013 American television series debuts
2013 American television series endings
Cultural depictions of Bathsheba
Christianity in popular culture controversies
Cultural depictions of Abraham
Cultural depictions of Adam and Eve
Cultural depictions of Cyrus the Great
Cultural depictions of David
Cultural depictions of Esther
Cultural depictions of Judas Iscariot
Cultural depictions of Judith
Cultural depictions of Mary, mother of Jesus
Cultural depictions of Moses
Cultural depictions of Nebuchadnezzar II
Cultural depictions of Noah
Cultural depictions of Pontius Pilate
Cultural depictions of Ramesses II
Films set in ancient Egypt
English-language television shows
Fiction about God
History (American TV channel) original programming
Portrayals of Jesus on television
Television series based on the Bible
Television series by MGM Television
Television series by 20th Century Fox Television
Television series created by Mark Burnett
Television series created by Roma Downey
Television shows filmed in Morocco
Television shows set in Egypt
Television shows set in Israel
Television shows set in Palestine
Television shows set in Syria
Portrayals of Saint Joseph in film
Portrayals of Mary Magdalene in film
Cultural depictions of Saint Peter
Television series set in the 1st century
Television shows scored by Hans Zimmer